The Mehrten Formation is a geologic formation in California. It preserves fossils dating back to the Neogene period.

See also

 List of fossiliferous stratigraphic units in California
 Paleontology in California

References
 

Neogene California
Geology of Sacramento County, California